Florian Neukart is an Austrian business executive, computer scientist, physicist, and scientific author known for his work in quantum computing and artificial intelligence. He has primarily been working on utilizing quantum computers, artificial intelligence, and related technologies for solving industry problems. In his work on artificial intelligence, he describes methods for interpreting signals in the human brain in combination with paradigms from artificial intelligence to create artificial conscious entities.

Biography
Neukart holds a Ph.D. in computer science from the Transilvania University of Brasov and master's degrees in physics, information technology, and computer science from the Liverpool John Moores University, CAMPUS02 University of Applied Sciences and the Joanneum University of Applied Sciences.

Work 
He is a member of the Board of Management at Terra Quantum AG, and previously worked as Director, Advanced Technologies and IT Innovation at Volkswagen Group of America, where he was concerned with research in the fields of quantum computing, quantum machine learning, artificial intelligence, and materials science. Neukart, born in Bruck/Mur, was also a member of the World Economic Forum's global future council on quantum computing, and an assistant professor for quantum computing at Leiden University.

He is the author of the books "Reverse Engineering the Mind Consciously Acting Machines and Accelerated Evolution", in which he elaborates on establishing a symbiotic relationship between a biological brain, sensors, AI, and quantum hard- and software, resulting in solutions for the continuous consciousness problem as well as other state-of-the-art problems, and "Humankind's Hunger for Energy: The journey of a million years, from using flints to harvesting galaxies", in which he describes the evolution of humankind in terms of its energy consumption. He is the co-editor of the book "Chancen und Risiken der Quantentechnologien", in which the potential and the risks of quantum technologies for society and industry are discussed.

His work has been featured broadly in the media. He was one of the first researchers to propose and implement quantum neural networks. At Volkswagen, he pioneered applied quantum computing and was among the first ones to solve real-world problems of society and environment employing quantum computers. Neukart was awarded by the Science Park Austria for his work in biologically-inspired artificial intelligence software.

References

1982 births
Living people
21st-century Austrian mathematicians
21st-century Austrian philosophers
21st-century Austrian physicists
Theoretical computer scientists
Austrian computer scientists
Quantum mind
Quantum physicists